The Rural Municipality of St. Philips No. 301 is a rural municipality (RM) in the Canadian province of Saskatchewan within Census Division No. 9 and  Division No. 4.

History 
The RM of St. Philips No. 301 incorporated as a rural municipality on January 1, 1913.

Geography

Communities and localities 
The following urban municipalities are surrounded by the RM.

Villages
 Pelly

Demographics 

Attractions 
 Madge Lake
 Fort Pelly
 Duck Mountain Provincial Park

Government 
The RM of St. Philips No. 301 is governed by an elected municipal council and an appointed administrator that meets on the third Thursday of every month. The reeve position is vacant while the RM's administrator is Frances Olson. The RM's office is located in Pelly.

Transportation 
 Canadian National Railway
 Saskatchewan Highway 8
 Saskatchewan Highway 49

See also 
List of rural municipalities in Saskatchewan

References 

St. Philips

Division No. 9, Saskatchewan